Snake in the Garden is the seventeenth episode of the second season of Scandal. It premiered on March 28, 2013 in the U.S.

The episode marks the first appearance of Joe Morton and the first mention of Operation Remington both of which would continue to play key roles throughout the second and third seasons. Morton would also become a series regular for the 5th to 7th seasons of the series.

Plot
Fitz asks Jake to find more information from the same source that leaked the location of the Kashfar hostages hinting at a promotion if he is successful.

Cyrus locates Charlie and asks him to investigate Jake.

Across town David returns home to find his apartment ransacked. He hears someone in his apartment and hides, seeing only the shoes of the burglar as they retreat. Shaken up he relocates to Olivia's offices.

As Huck and Quinn tail CIA director Osborne they realize they've been made as he makes his way to Olivia's building. They warn Olivia that he is coming and she hides Wendy's flash drive which Jake, who is watching through the cameras he has in her apartment, sees. The two have a tense meeting and Osborne tell her to back off. While he is at Olivia's apartment the cameras Jake is using malfunction.

The next morning Hollis Doyle arrives at Olivia's offices with his fourth ex-wife and a video of his daughter Maybelle telling him she has been kidnapped and he needs to wire 20 million dollars to a secret account. His wife is moved to tears but Doyle believes that his daughter orchestrated the entire thing in order to access his money after he cut her off for being a drug addict. He asks the team to locate his daughter but refuses to pay any money in order to ensure her safety. While the team search for Maybelle, Hollis is sent a package that contains Maybelle's ear but remains unmoved until he is sent video evidence of Maybelle missing the ear. The team sends half the money to the kidnapper and then send the other half after they see Maybelle is alive. They bring her to a hospital where she tells them her ex-boyfriend was the kidnapper.

Jake breaks into Olivia's apartment to fix the cameras and steal the flash drive she has hidden. He brings the information to Fitz, and tells him that Osborne is the mole.

Cyrus discovers through Charlie that Fitz was involved with Jake in a top secret mission in Iran called Operation Remington. He tells Fitz that the work he did stealing votes in Defiance is similar to Fitz's top secret mission in Iran and Fitz brings him back to the fold, telling Cyrus about his plans to raid Osborne's house and expose him as the mole.

Jake tries to go on another date with Olivia but she tells him she is still preoccupied by her last relationship. He insists he is still interested in her and the two kiss.

Huck and Harrison discover that Maybelle kidnapped herself. When she tries to leave with her money Huck picks her up and her parents confront her. Hollis tells her she can come back to the family home or she can leave with the money. Maybelle chooses the money and cuts off her relationship with her parents.

Osborne goes to Cyrus and denies that he's the mole. Cyrus informs him that it's out of his hands and that Fitz has made the decision.

Fitz discovers that Mellie has cancelled the family weekend he has planned involving their two children. When he accuses her of not loving their children and being cold she reveals that she cancelled in order to protect the children who are afraid of their father and can smell the liquor on him.

At Olivia Pope and Associates the gladiators hear the news that George Osborne committed suicide.

Jake sits on a bench drinking coffee when a man (Joe Morton) sits down beside him. They chat about the weather before the man praises Jake for staging Osborne's suicide and convincing everyone he's the mole.

Critical reception
Ryan McGee at The A.V. Club gave the episode a B+ noting that the final third of the episode was "so great that it's easy to forget that almost next to nothing of interest really happened before it."

References

Scandal (TV series) episodes
2013 American television episodes